Joshua Brookes (24 November 1761 – 10 January 1833) was a British anatomist and naturalist.

Early life
Brookes studied under William Hunter, William Hewson, Andrew Marshall, and John Sheldon, in London. He then attended the practice of Antoine Portal and other eminent surgeons at the Hôtel-Dieu de Paris.

Brookesian Museum
Brookes became a teacher of anatomy in London, and the founder of the Brookesian Museum of Comparative Anatomy.  This private museum is described in the 1830 catalogue Museum Brookesianum.

Later life
Elected a Fellow of the Royal Society in 1819, Brookes gave up teaching in 1826, in bad health. After vainly endeavouring to dispose of his museum collection entire, he sold it off piecemeal. The final sale took place on 1 March 1830, and on 22 following days. He died on 10 January 1833 in Great Portland Street, London.

Works
Brookes was the first to place the Cheetah in its own genus, which he established in 1828 as Acinonyx.

His published writings included:
 Lectures on the Anatomy of the Ostrich (The Lancet, vol. xii.);
 Brookesian Museum, 1827; 
 Catalogue of Zootomical Collection, 1828; 
 Address to the Zoological Club of the Linnean Society, 1828;
 Thoughts on Cholera, 1831, proposing hygienic and sanitary precautions; and 
 a description of a new genus of Rodentia (Trans. Linn. Soc., 1829).

Legacy
The generic name, Brookesia, is in honour of Joshua Brookes.
Joshua Brookes once encountered Chang and Eng, the original Siamese Twins.  According to Frederick Drimmer's book Very Special People, Brookes "provided a document declaring that the twins 'constitute a most extraordinary Lusus Naturae [sport of nature], the first instance I have seen of a double living child; they being totally devoid of deception, afford a very interesting spectacle, and they are highly deserving of public patronage.'"

References
Dobson, J. (1952) Eighteenth Century Anatomists: Joshua Brookes, Practitioner, 180–4.

Notes

Attribution

1761 births
1833 deaths
British zoologists
British anatomists
Fellows of the Royal Society
Fellows of the Linnean Society of London
British expatriates in France